The 2011–12 Florida Panthers season was the 19th season for the National Hockey League (NHL) franchise that was established on June 14, 1993.

The Panthers qualified for the Stanley Cup playoffs for the first time in 12 years after their previous playoff appearance in 2000, and also won their division for the first time. However, the Panthers could not further their progress, losing in the opening round to the New Jersey Devils, who would go on to be the Stanley Cup runner-up. The Panthers had a 3–2 lead in the series before losing Games 6 and 7 to be eliminated from the playoffs.

Off-season
On June 1, 2011, the Panthers introduced their new head coach, former NHL player Kevin Dineen. Dineen had spent the previous six seasons coaching the Portland Pirates of the American Hockey League (AHL).

Regular season
See the game log below for detailed game-by-game season information.

The Panthers had their first quality season in over a decade in 2011–12, having never finished above third place in the Southeast Division since 1999–2000. Despite losing more games than they won, competition for the Panthers within the Division was not fierce, and the team was in third place in the Eastern Conference as the Southeast Division leader throughout much of the season. Although the Panthers amassed more losses than wins, 18 of these losses were in overtime or a shootout (the highest number of any team in the NHL for the 2011–12 season), meaning Florida often gained a point even when they failed to win.

Playoffs
The Panthers clinched a playoff berth on April 5, 2012, securing the return of playoff hockey to South Florida for the first time in 12 years. The third-seeded Panthers had home ice advantage by virtue of winning their division, despite the sixth-seeded New Jersey Devils besting them in regular season point totals (102 to 94). The Devils won the first game of the series, but the Panthers bounced back with a win in Game 2 to even the series as it headed to New Jersey. The Panthers would return the favor by winning Game 3, 4–3, but the Devils recorded a shutout in Game 4, 4–0. The Panthers returned home to play Game 5 and were one win away from winning their first post-season series since 1996 after notching a shutout of their own, 3–0. The series went back to New Jersey for the final time of the series, with the home team tying the series after winning Game 6 in overtime, the first extra period of the series. The seventh and deciding game went even longer than Game 6 after the Panthers managed to score two power-play goals in the third period to force overtime. The game—and series—was still even after the completion of one extra period. Less than four minutes into the second overtime, the first shot on goal by either team was recorded by Devils rookie center Adam Henrique and notched his second goal of the game and deciding goal of the series, eliminating the Panthers from the playoffs, 3–2.

Standings

Schedule and results

Pre-season

Regular season

Playoffs

Player statistics

Skaters
Note: GP = Games played; G = Goals; A = Assists; Pts = Points; +/− = Plus/minus; PIM = Penalty minutes

Goaltenders
Note: GP = Games played; TOI = Time on ice (minutes); W = Wins; L = Losses; OT = Overtime losses; GA = Goals ; GAA= Goals against average; SA= Shots against; SV= Saves; Sv% = Save percentage; SO= Shutouts

†Denotes player spent time with another team before joining Panthers. Stats reflect time with Panthers only.
‡Traded mid-season
Bold/italics denotes franchise record

Awards and records

Awards

Records

Milestones

Transactions 

The Panthers have been involved in the following transactions during the 2011–12 season.

Trades

Free agents acquired

Free agents lost

Claimed via waivers

Lost via waivers

Lost via retirement

Player signings

Draft picks 
Florida's picks at the 2011 NHL Entry Draft in St. Paul, Minnesota.

See also 
 2011–12 NHL season

References

Florida Panthers seasons
F
F
2011 in sports in Florida
2012 in sports in Florida